Gaming the system (also rigging, abusing, cheating, milking, playing, working, or breaking the system, or gaming or bending the rules) can be defined as using the rules and procedures meant to protect a system to, instead, manipulate the system for a desired outcome.

According to James Rieley, a British advisor to CEOs and an author, structures in companies and organizations (both explicit and implicit policies and procedures, stated goals, and mental models) drive behaviors that are detrimental to long-term organizational success and stifle competition. For some, error is the essence of gaming the system, in which a gap in protocol allows for errant practices that lead to unintended results. 

Although the term generally carries negative connotations, gaming the system can be used for benign purposes in the undermining and dismantling of corrupt or oppressive organisations.

History

The first known documented use of the term "gaming the system" is in 1975.

Examples

Finance
Henry Paulson, considering that the financial crisis of 2007–08 demonstrated that US financial markets had outgrown the ability of the system that had been used to regulate them, saw as a necessity a better framework than US financial markets had used before. This framework would be one that featured less duplication and that restricted the ability of financial firms to pick and choose their own, generally less strict  regulators—a practice known as regulatory arbitrage, which enabled widespread gaming of the regulatory system.

A similar, contributing effect has been identified within corporate rating systems, where gaming the system becomes virulent when formalization is combined with transparency.

Internet 

Designers of online communities are explicitly warned that whenever one creates a system for managing a community, someone will try to work it to their advantage. Accordingly, they are advised from the start to think like a bad guy and to consider what behaviors they are unintentionally encouraging by creating some new social rules for the community.

Child-rearing
Parental divisions on child-rearing will always give the child plenty of opportunity to play one parent off against the other. Object relations theory states that if one parent is easy-going and the other stricter, a child is likely to take advantage of that split. According to this theory, this is always a hollow triumph; the child is really hoping that the parents will begin to work together to set limits.

It has been noted that contingent feedingoffering treats if an unpopular food is eatenencourages children to argue and practice gaming the system by fighting over the fine print.

NHS dentistry
NHS dentistry in the UK sees the frequent use of gaming the system in the form of adapting treatment to the payment system, which is frequently referred to as simply "gaming". The practice of adapting treatment to payment systems, rather than clinical need, is thought to be widespread in NHS dentistry and is considered by some to be a result of a poorly planned target based system. The term is also used to describe obfuscation of the scope of NHS dentistry in order to "upsell" items of treatment that should be available.

Performance management

In performance management, gaming the system is finding ways to achieve good scores on performance metrics (for employees or departments) without achieving the aims of the corporation which the metrics were instigated to promote. This is related to the well-known problem inherent in incentive system design, sometimes known as perverse incentive, in that people will tend to pursue incentives, even by means that make no common sense, should the incentive be naively constructed. For instance, criticism of author-level metrics in science often described the vulnerabilities to gaming strategies of such metrics.

Algorithmic governance

Whenever greater transparency is brought by the government to previously secret decisions, those decision processes become more gameable. Parties adjust their behavior to maximize their outcomes. The case of algorithmic governance is not exceptional. Regulated parties might even employ adversarial machine learning in order to fool algorithmic models.

Other
Eric Berne identified a kind of gaming the system in a clinical context through what he called the game of "Psychiatry", with its motto "You will never cure me, but you will teach me to be a better neurotic (play a better game of 'Psychiatry')." A few patients, he noted, carefully pick weak psychoanalysts, moving from one to another, demonstrating that they can't be cured and meanwhile learning to play a sharper and sharper game of 'Psychiatry;' eventually it becomes difficult for even a first-rate clinician to separate the wheat from the chaff.

Some people confuse "gaming the system" with "working the system".  Gaming the system has a negative connotation, while working the system has a positive meaning.  Working the system implies that one is using an understanding to work within the system to attain sets of goals that align, whereas gaming the system implies using this understanding to attain specific goals that don't align with the rest of a set of goals. Depending on the observers' interest or preferred goals, this may be perceived as unfair or as an outcome for which the system was never intended. The cause of the difference between gaming the system and working the system lies in the existence of a (perceived) conflict between goals.

See also

References

Further reading
 
 
 

 
 
 
 
 
 
Ziewitz, M. (2019). "Rethinking gaming: The ethical work of optimization in web search engines". Social Studies of Science: 1–25.

Political terminology
Abuse of the legal system
 
Political corruption